Usta angulata, the angled emperor, is a species of moth in the family Saturniidae. It is found in Kenya, Tanzania, Somalia and Botswana.

References

Moths described in 1895
angulata
Moths of Africa